Oct-2 (octamer-binding protein 2) also known as POU domain, class 2, transcription factor 2 is a protein that in humans is encoded by the POU2F2 gene.

Oct-2 is an octamer transcription factor which is a member of the POU family.

References

External links 
 
 

POU-domain proteins